Tanda is a town in Gujrat District in the Pakistani province of Punjab.  It is a Union council, an administrative subdivision of Gujrat Tehsil.

History
The word Tanda means "Place of stay" in the sanskrit language. Before the Partition of Punjab in 1947 the town had a large population of Sikhs belonging to the Labana community. Labanas were brought in by Choudhery of Amrtser to protect them from the gangs of thieves use to come from   Village Mota of Near to Tanda and to loot the villagers.  After partition they migrated to East Punjab, conversely [ 70%[Gujjar]] tribes from Jammu & Kashmir migrated into the Tanda area at the same time.  Labanas established a community school in Tanda for the free education of their community, for this cause their tribe decided that no women will wear jewelry and all held should be deposited for the establishment of school. This school with boarding house very quickly established its repo and even before partition considered one of the best schools in the zone.

Geography
Tanda is the name of a small locality, which is a well-known small city of Gujrat. A village located 5 km near Tanda named Barila Sharif. That village is famous for saint and graves; there was a famous grave of Qanbeet that is 70 yards long. All over the Punjab people visited that place.

Climate
The city has moderate climate. During the peak of summer, the daytime temperature shoots up to 45 °C, but the hot spells are relatively short due to the proximity of the Azad Kashmir Mountains. During the winter, the minimum temperature may fall below 2 °C. The average rainfall is 67 cm.

Demography
Most people in the town speak Punjabi. Urdu and English is also spoken by the educated elite.

See also
Marala Headworks
Jalalpur Jattan
Behlol Pur, Gujrat
Gujrat City

References

Populated places in Gujrat District